The Kansu red deer (Cervus canadensis kansuensis) is a subspecies of wapiti found in the Gansu province of China. This subspecies forms, along with the closely related Sichuan deer, and Tibetan red deer, the southernmost wapiti group.

References

Elk and red deer